Cyperus scaber is a species of sedge that is native to north eastern parts of Australia.

See also 
 List of Cyperus species

References 

scaber
Plants described in 1875
Flora of the Northern Territory
Flora of New South Wales
Flora of Queensland
Taxa named by Johann Otto Boeckeler